For the American former professional basketball player, see Stacey Thomas.

Stacey Thomas (born December 4, 1984 in New Orleans, Louisiana) is an American football strong safety. Thomas has played professionally in Europe since the 2009 season. He has represented Dauphins de Nice in France and Oulu Northern Lights and Seinajoki Crocodiles in the Finnish Division I and Maple League. Thomas played for the Swiss team Calanda Broncos in 2014. Most recently he returned to Finnish Division I with Porvoo Butchers in 2015. In April 2016 he signed a 2 year contract with Finnish Maple League team Wasa Royals. Thomas officially retired after 2018 season and owns a gym in Vaasa.

Thomas has NFL experience with the Buffalo Bills as an offseason member. Coming out of Texas Southern University Thomas was originally signed by the Bills as an undrafted free agent in 2007. He was released on July 27 that year .

1984 births
Living people
Players of American football from New Orleans
American football safeties
Texas Southern Tigers football players
Buffalo Bills players